Chester Bailey Fernald (18 March 1869 – 10 April 1938) was an American author and playwright

History
Fernald was born in Boston, Massachusetts.

He moved to London, living in Gower Street, W.C. sometime around 1915, to be with his son Van Dyke Fernald, who volunteered for the British army. The son died in the War.

He died in Dover Harbour, believed drowned, after being knocked overboard by the boom of his boat, the auxiliary cutter Florence. His son, J. B. Fernald, had thrown out a rope to him, but to no avail. They had just returned from a voyage to France.

Works
Books
Chinatown Stories
The Cat and the Cherub and other Stories
The White Umbrella
Plays
The Ghetto
The Love Thief
The Mask and the Face
The Princess in the Cage
The Day Before the Day — "anti-German vitriol"
The Moonlight Blossom played by Mrs Patrick Campbell
The Cat and the Cherub
98.9
His short stories were published in, inter alia, Harper's Magazine.

References 

1869 births
1938 deaths
20th-century American dramatists and playwrights